The 2017–18 GET-ligaen was the 79th season of Norway's premier ice hockey league, GET-ligaen.

The regular season began in September 2017. There was no team changes from the 2016–17 season.

Participating teams

Arenas 
On the season opener September 8, Vålerenga Ishockey played Storhamar Hockey in Gjøvik Olympic Cavern Hall. 

Since Nye Jordal Amfi will not be completed until the 2019–20 season, Vålerenga used Furuset Forum as a temporary arena the whole season.
Previous to Vålerengas match against Storhamar November 13, Furuset Forums capacity was 1,450.

Lillehammer returned to Håkons Hall on November 18, when they met Storhamar in front of a crowd of 10,031 people, which was new indoor attendance record for a Norwegian league match.

Regular season standings 
Updated as of February 28, 2018.
x – clinched playoff spot; y – clinched regular season league title; r – play in relegation series

Source: hockey.no

Statistics

Scoring leaders 

List shows the ten best skaters based on the number of points during the regular season. If two or more skaters are tied (i.e. same number of points, goals and played games), all of the tied skaters are shown. Updated as of February 27, 2018.

GP = Games played; G = Goals; A = Assists; Pts = Points; +/– = Plus/Minus; PIM = Penalty Minutes

Source: hockey.no

Leading goaltenders 
The top five goaltenders based on goals against average. Updated as of June 8, 2017.

Source: hockey.no

Attendance 

Source:hockey.no

Coaching changes

Playoffs 
After the regular season, the top eight teams qualified for the playoffs. In the first and second rounds, the highest remaining seed chose which of the two lowest remaining seeds to be matched against. In each round the higher-seeded team was awarded home ice advantage. Each best-of-seven series followed a 1–1–1–1–1–1–1 format: the higher-seeded team played at home for games 1 and 3 (plus 5 and 7 if necessary), and the lower-seeded team at home for games 2, 4 and 6 (if necessary).

Bracket
Updated as of April 11, 2018.

Source: hockey.no

Qualification 
After the regular season had ended, the two lowest ranked teams in the league and the two highest ranked teams in the 1. divisjon competed for the right to play in the 2018–19 GET-ligaen. The tournament was organized according to a double round robin format, where each club played the others twice, home and away, for a total of six games. The points system and ranking method used, was the same as in the GET-ligaen.

Standings
Updated as of March 22, 2018.

q – qualified for next years GET-league; r – will play in next years 1. division

Source: hockey.no

Awards
All-Star team

The following players were selected to the 2017–18 GET-ligaen All-Star team:
Goaltender: Christoffer Bengtsberg (Lillehammer)
Defenseman: Kodie Curran (Storhamar)
Defenseman: Troy Rutkowski (Sparta)
Center: Tobias Lindström (Vålerenga)
Winger: David Morley (Lillehammer)
Winger: Gary Nunn (Frisk Asker)

Other
Coach of the year: David Livingston (Manglerud Star)
Rookie of the year: Jacob Lundell Noer (Lillehammer)

References

External links 
  

2017-18
Nor
GET-ligaen